Oscar William Westerberg (July 8, 1882, Alameda, California – April 17, 1909, Alameda, California) was a Major League Baseball shortstop who played for the Boston Doves in 1907.

Prior to playing professionally, he attended Saint Mary's College of California.

He made his debut on September 5, 1907 and played his final game on September 7, 1907. In that time, he appeared in two games, collecting two hits in six at-bats for a .333 batting average. He also handled six chances in the field without committing any errors.

Westerberg also played at least four seasons in the minors. In 31 games in 1908, he hit only .131 for the New Haven Blues and Trenton Tigers.

Following his death, he was interred at Mountain View Cemetery in Oakland, California.

References

1882 births
1909 deaths
Baseball players from California
Boston Doves players
Stockton (minor league baseball) players
Saint Mary's Gaels baseball players
Alameda Grays players
Tacoma Tigers players
Portland Beavers players
New Haven Blues players
Trenton Tigers players